CCGS Matthew was a Canadian Coast Guard mid-shore scientific research and survey vessel, based at Dartmouth, Nova Scotia,  that entered service in 1990. The ship operated within the Canadian Coast Guard Maritimes region. Matthew was primarily used to carry out hydrographic survey work primarily for the production of nautical charting products on the East and West Coasts, but could also be used for stock assessment using sonar. In 2016, the ship was taken out of service and put up for sale. In 2019 the vessel was sold and renamed Miss MJ.

Description
The ship is powered by two Caterpillar 3508 geared diesel engines rated at  driving two controllable pitch propellers  and a bow thruster. The ship is also equipped with two Caterpillar 3406 generators and one Caterpillar 3406 emergency generator.

Matthew is equipped with four boats and has one HIAB seacrane capable of lifting . The ship has two laboratories both ; one for hydrographic purposes and one for combined hydrographic/drafting purposes. The research vessel is equipped with Sperry Marine Bridgemaster II navigational radar operating on the X-band. The ship has a complement of 14, with 6 officers and 8 crew. Matthew also has six additional berths.

Refits
During 2005 the vessel was equipped with an advanced, multi-beam echo-sounder. Suggested alterations to sonar were met with a lack of enthusiasm. Nonetheless, subsequent missions were able to be conducted with only minor delays, none of which were related to the new sonars.

As a part of Canada's Economic Action Plan in 2009–2010, Matthew underwent a refit in Quebec City costing over $105,000, involving systems replacement, crane replacement, and reliability improvements. In May 2011 Matthew received a short refit. Matthew has minimal ice strengthening in its forward hull, and no strengthening of its rudders, shafting and propellers for operation in ice-covered waters.

Construction and career
Constructed by Versatile Pacific Shipyards Ltd. at their yard in North Vancouver, British Columbia with the yard number 511. Matthew was launched on 29 April 1990 and completed in September 1990. The ship was commissioned that year and named for John Cabot's ship  from his second voyage to North America. The name came from a competition among high school students from Newfoundland and Labrador. The ship was based at the Bedford Institute of Oceanography in Nova Scotia and registered in Ottawa, Ontario.

In 1998, Matthew was among the Canadian Coast Guard vessels assigned to the search for Swissair Flight 111, mapping the wreckage off the coast of Nova Scotia. The ship participated in the mapping of Placentia Bay, Newfoundland, in co-operation with Natural Resources Canada and the Canadian Hydrographic Service in April 2004. The vessel was used for mapping the coastal sea floor and harbour entries, which allowed smaller craft to keep closer the shoreline rather than sail out in the heavier seas. The vessel spent much of its time updating nautical charts that had not been reviewed since the time of Captain James Cook. Matthew was also detailed to investigate sinkholes in Bras d’Or Lake of Cape Breton Island. Matthew was decommissioned in 2016, renamed 2015-03 and was put up for auction. The former Coast Guard vessel was taken out of service due to a change in the way coastal mapping was to be performed by the government, with a switch towards "coastal parties, ship-based surveys and airborne hydrography." The ship was put up for auction five times, receiving no bids. In 2019, the ship was sold to a numbered company in Newfoundland and Labrador and renamed Miss M.J. or Miss MJ. The vessel was towed to Sydney, Nova Scotia for a refit before further sale.

Notes

Citations

Sources

External links

 Track CCGS Matthew online

1990 ships
Ships of the Canadian Coast Guard
Ships built in British Columbia